Ločki Vrh is a small settlement in the Slovene Hills in the  Municipality of Benedikt in northeastern Slovenia. The area is part of the traditional region of Styria and is now included in the Drava Statistical Region.

An intact Roman-period burial mound in a forest near the settlement has so far not been excavated.

References

External links
Ločki Vrh at Geopedia

Populated places in the Municipality of Benedikt